Ian Nicholas Stewart  (born 24 September 1945) is a British mathematician  and a  popular-science and science-fiction writer. He is Emeritus Professor of Mathematics at the University of Warwick, England.

Education and early life
Stewart was born in 1945 in Folkestone, England. While in the sixth form at Harvey Grammar School in Folkestone he came to the attention of the mathematics teacher. The teacher had Stewart sit mock A-level examinations without any preparation along with the upper-sixth students; Stewart was placed first in the examination. He was awarded a scholarship to study at the University of Cambridge as an undergraduate student of Churchill College, Cambridge, where he studied the Mathematical Tripos and obtained a first-class Bachelor of Arts degree in mathematics in 1966. Stewart then went to the University of Warwick where his PhD on Lie algebras was supervised by Brian Hartley and completed in 1969.

Career and research
After his PhD, Stewart was offered an academic position at Warwick. He is well known for his popular expositions of mathematics and his contributions to catastrophe theory.

While at Warwick, Stewart edited the mathematical magazine Manifold.  He also wrote a column called "Mathematical Recreations" for Scientific American magazine from 1991 to 2001. This followed the work of past columnists like Martin Gardner, Douglas Hofstadter, and A. K. Dewdney.  Altogether, he wrote 96 columns for Scientific American, which were later reprinted in the books "Math Hysteria", "How to Cut a Cake: And Other Mathematical Conundrums" and "Cows in the Maze".

Stewart has held visiting academic positions in Germany (1974), New Zealand (1976), and the US (University of Connecticut 1977–78, University of Houston 1983–84).

Stewart has published more than 140 scientific papers, including a series of influential papers co-authored with Jim Collins on coupled oscillators and the symmetry of animal gaits.

Stewart has collaborated with Jack Cohen and Terry Pratchett on four popular science books based on Pratchett's Discworld. In 1999 Terry Pratchett made both Jack Cohen and Professor Ian Stewart "Honorary Wizards of the Unseen University" at the same ceremony at which the University of Warwick gave Terry Pratchett an honorary degree.

In March 2014 Ian Stewart's iPad app, Incredible Numbers by Professor Ian Stewart, launched in the App Store. The app was produced in partnership with Profile Books and Touch Press.

Mathematics and popular science

Manifold, mathematical magazine published at the University of Warwick (1960s)
 Nut-crackers: Puzzles and Games to Boggle the Mind (Piccolo Books) with John Jaworski, 1971. 
Concepts of Modern Mathematics (1975)
Oh! Catastrophe (1982, in French)
Does God Play Dice? The New Mathematics of Chaos (1989)
Game, Set and Math (1991)
Fearful Symmetry (1992)
Another Fine Math You've Got Me Into (1992)
The Collapse of Chaos: Discovering Simplicity in a Complex World, with Jack Cohen (1995)
Nature's Numbers: The Unreal Reality of Mathematics (1995)
What is Mathematics? – originally by Richard Courant and Herbert Robbins, second edition revised by Ian Stewart (1996)
From Here to Infinity (1996), originally published as The Problems of Mathematics (1987)
Figments of Reality, with Jack Cohen (1997)
The Magical Maze: Seeing the World Through Mathematical Eyes (1998) 
Life's Other Secret (1998)
What Shape is a Snowflake? (2001)
Flatterland (2001)  (See Flatland)
The Annotated Flatland (2002)
Evolving the Alien: The Science of Extraterrestrial Life, with Jack Cohen (2002). Second edition published as What Does a Martian Look Like? The Science of Extraterrestrial Life.
Math Hysteria (2004) 
The Mayor of Uglyville's Dilemma (2005)
Letters to a Young Mathematician (2006) 
How to Cut a Cake: And Other Mathematical Conundrums (2006) 
Why Beauty Is Truth: A History of Symmetry (2007) 
Taming the infinite: The story of Mathematics from the first numbers to chaos theory (2008) 
Professor Stewart's Cabinet of Mathematical Curiosities (2008) 
Professor Stewart's Hoard of Mathematical Treasures: Another Drawer from the Cabinet of Curiosities (2009) 
Cows in the Maze: And Other Mathematical Explorations (2010) 
The Mathematics of Life (2011) 
In Pursuit of the Unknown: 17 Equations That Changed the World (2012) 
Symmetry: A Very Short Introduction (2013) 
Visions of Infinity: The Great Mathematical Problems (2013) 
Professor Stewart's Casebook of Mathematical Mysteries (2014) 
Incredible Numbers by Professor Ian Stewart (iPad app) (2014)
Calculating the Cosmos: How Mathematics Unveils the Universe (2016) 
Infinity: A Very Short Introduction (2017), Oxford University Press.
Significant Figures: The Lives and Work of Great Mathematicians (2017) 

Do Dice Play God? The Mathematics of Uncertainty (2019), Profile Books.
What's the use ?: How mathematics shapes everyday life? (2021), Basic Books.

Computer programming
Easy Programming for the ZX Spectrum (1982), with Robin Jones, Shiva Publishing Ltd., 
Computer Puzzles For Spectrum & ZX81 (1982), with Robin Jones, Shiva Publishing Ltd., 
Timex Sinclair 1000: Programs, Games, and Graphics, with Robin Jones, Birkhäuser, 
Spectrum Machine Code (1983), with Robin Jones, Shiva Publishing Ltd., 
Further Programming for the ZX Spectrum (1983), with Robin Jones, Shiva Publishing Ltd., 
Gateway to Computing with the ZX Spectrum (1984), Shiva Publishing Ltd.,

Science of Discworld series

The Science of Discworld, with Jack Cohen and Terry Pratchett
The Science of Discworld II: The Globe, with Jack Cohen and Terry Pratchett
The Science of Discworld III: Darwin's Watch, with Jack Cohen and Terry Pratchett
The Science of Discworld IV: Judgement Day, with Jack Cohen and Terry Pratchett

Textbooks
Catastrophe Theory and its Applications, with Tim Poston, Pitman, 1978. .
Complex Analysis: The Hitchhiker's Guide to the Plane, I. Stewart, D Tall. 1983 
Algebraic number theory and Fermat's last theorem, 3rd Edition, I. Stewart, D Tall. A. K. Peters (2002) 
Galois Theory, 3rd Edition, Chapman and Hall (2000)  Galois Theory Errata
The Foundations of Mathematics, 2nd Edition, I. Stewart, D Tall. (2015)

Science fiction
Wheelers, with Jack Cohen (fiction)
Heaven, with Jack Cohen, Aspect, May 2004 (fiction)

Science and mathematics

Awards and honours
In 1995 Stewart received the Michael Faraday Medal and in 1997 he gave the Royal Institution Christmas Lecture on The Magical Maze. He was elected as a Fellow of the Royal Society in 2001. Stewart was the first recipient in 2008 of the Christopher Zeeman Medal, awarded jointly by the London Mathematical Society (LMS) and the Institute of Mathematics and its Applications (IMA) for his work on promoting mathematics.

Personal life
Stewart married Avril, in 1970. They met at a party at a house that Avril was renting while she trained as a nurse. They have two sons. He lists his recreations as science fiction, painting, guitar, keeping fish, geology, Egyptology and snorkelling.

References

External links

personal webpage
Michael Faraday prize winners 2004–1986
Directory of Fellows of the Royal Society: Ian Stewart
Prof Ian Stewart at Debrett's People of Today
What does a Martian look like? Jack Cohen and Ian Stewart set out to find the answers
Ian Stewart on space exploration by NASA
Ian Stewart on Minesweeper one of the Millennium mathematics problems 
Press release about Terry Pratchett "Wizard Making" of Jack Cohen and Ian Stewart at the University of Warwick
Interview with Ian Stewart on the Science of Discworld series
Audio Interview with Ian Stewart on April 25, 2007 from WINA's Charlottesville Right Now
Podcast series with Ian Stewart on the history of symmetry
A Partly True Story initially published in: Scientific American, Feb 1993
"The Joy of Mathematics – A conversation with Ian Stewart", Ideas Roadshow, 2013
"In conversation with Ian Stewart", Chalkdust Magazine, 2016

20th-century English mathematicians
21st-century English mathematicians
People from Folkestone
English science writers
Fellows of the Royal Society
Alumni of the University of Warwick
Alumni of Churchill College, Cambridge
1945 births
Living people
Academics of the University of Warwick
Professors of Gresham College
Mathematics popularizers
British textbook writers
Recreational mathematicians